Liam De Smet (born 12 April 2004) is a Belgian footballer who currently plays as a midfielder for Club NXT. He is the twin brother of teammate Lenn De Smet.

Career statistics

Club

Notes

References

2004 births
Living people
Belgian footballers
Belgium youth international footballers
Association football midfielders
Challenger Pro League players
Club Brugge KV players
Club NXT players